Sikanni Chief Lake is a lake at the headwaters of the Sikanni Chief River in the Northern Rocky Mountains region of British Columbia, Canada.

See also
Sikanni (disambiguation)
Sekani

References

Lakes of British Columbia
Northern Interior of British Columbia
Peace River Land District